The 2017 Malaysia Cup knockout phase began on 15 September 2017 and concluded on 4 November 2017 with the final at Shah Alam Stadium in Selangor, Malaysia to decide the champions of the 2017 Malaysia Cup. A total of 8 teams competed in the knockout phase.

Round and draw dates
The draw for the 2017 Malaysia Cup was held on at the 22 May 2017 with the participating team coaches and captains in attendance.

Format
The knockout phase involved the eight teams which qualified as winners and runners-up of each of the eight groups in the group stage.

Each tie in the knockout phase, apart from the final, was played over two legs, with each team playing one leg at home. The team that scored more goals on aggregate over the two legs advanced to the next round. If the aggregate score was level, the away goals rule was applied, i.e. the team that scored more goals away from home over the two legs advanced. If away goals were also equal, then thirty minutes of extra time was played. The away goals rule was again applied after extra time, i.e. if there were goals scored during extra time and the aggregate score was still level, the visiting team advanced by virtue of more away goals scored. If no goals were scored during extra time, the tie was decided by penalty shoot-out. In the final, which was played as a single match, if scores were level at the end of normal time, extra time was played, followed by penalty shoot-out if scores remained tied.

The mechanism of the draws for each round was as follows:
In the draw for the quarter final, the four group winners were seeded, and the four group runners-up were unseeded. The seeded teams were drawn against the unseeded teams, with the seeded teams hosting the second leg. Teams from the same group or the same association could not be drawn against each other.
In the draws for the quarter-finals onwards, there were no seedings, and teams from the same group or the same association could be drawn against each other.

Qualified teams

Bracket

Quarter-finals
The first legs were played on 15 & 16 September 2017, and the second legs were played on 24 September 2017.
|}

First Leg

Second Leg

FELDA United won 5–4 on aggregate.

First Leg

Second Leg

Kedah won 4–2 on aggregate.
 
First Leg

Second Leg

Johor Darul Ta'zim won 5–2 on aggregate.

First Leg

Second Leg

Perak won 5–3 on aggregate.

Semi-finals
The first legs were played on 15 October 2017, and the second legs were played on 21 October 2017.

|}

First Leg

Second Leg

Kedah won 3–1 on aggregate.

First Leg

Second Leg
 
Johor Darul Ta'zim won 4–1 on aggregate.

Final

The final will be played on 4 November 2017 at the Shah Alam Stadium in Selangor, Malaysia.

References

Malaysia Cup knockout phase